Earl Spencer Dunkley, (born 5 September 1969) is a former basketball player from the UK.

References

External links
Spencer Dunkley on Lega Basket 
Spencer Dunkley on Liga ACB 

1969 births
Living people
American men's basketball players
Basketball players from Delaware
Besançon BCD players
British men's basketball players
CB Valladolid players
Centers (basketball)
Connecticut Pride players
Delaware Fightin' Blue Hens men's basketball players
Gent Hawks players
High school basketball coaches in the United States
Indiana Pacers draft picks
Liga ACB players
Limoges CSP players
London Towers players
Lugano Tigers players
Maccabi Haifa B.C. players
Maccabi Tel Aviv B.C. players
sportspeople from Wolverhampton